The Togo national badminton team represents Togo in international team competitions. The Togolese Badminton Federation (French: Federation Togolaise de Badminton) controls everything in the national team. Togo competed in its first team tournament at the 2019 African Badminton Championships mixed team event.

The team were eliminated in the group stages.

Participation in BCA competitions 

Mixed team

Current squad 

Men
Azim Issa
Koami Vivien Amoussou

Women
Rolande Adjima
Malika Dare

References 

Badminton
National badminton teams
Badminton in Togo